Rhagodima is a genus of solifuges within the family Rhagodidae. The species within the genus are found in India.

Species 

 Rhagodima annulata 
 Rhagodima nigrocincta

References 

Solifugae genera
Arthropods of India